Alfred Odenheimer Deshong (September 30, 1837 – April 19, 1913) was an American businessman, philanthropist and art collector from Chester, Pennsylvania.  Deshong came from a wealthy family including his grandfather Peter Deshong and father John O. Deshong.  He operated a successful quarry business for years and was a director of the Delaware County National Bank.  He invested his fortune in the collection of art.

Deshong donated liberally to support the Chester Hospital and upon his death, donated his trust and land to the city of Chester which resulted in the creation of the Deshong Art Museum and Deshong Park.  Over time, the museum fell into disrepair, suffered theft and eventually closed.  The art museum is currently vacant and the art collection resides with Widener University.

Early life
Deshong was born in Chester, Pennsylvania to John O. Deshong and Emmeline L. (Terrill) Deshong and educated in the local schools.  He attended the Bolmar Academy in West Chester, Pennsylvania.

In 1862, Deshong enlisted as a private in Company K, Tenth Regiment of the Pennsylvania Militia and served in the Battle of Antietam under Captain Thatcher.  He was honorably discharged on September 27, 1862.

In 1863, Deshong re-enlisted when Robert E. Lee invaded Pennsylvania.  He enlisted in company A of the 37th Regiment, Emergency Corps, known as the "Slipher Phalanx".  He served in the Battle of Gettysburg and was honorably discharged on August 4, 1863.

Career
In 1865, he entered into partnership with his brother, John O. Deshong, Jr., and operated the Deshong quarries in Ridley Township, Pennsylvania.  The partnership was successful and lasted for 30 years until John's death on November 1, 1895.

In 1895, Deshong was elected a director of the Delaware County National Bank.

Philanthropy
Deshong donated liberally to support Chester Hospital, located at 9th and Barclay Streets in Chester.  The Alfred O. Deshong sanitary cottage for the treatment of tuberculosis was built by Deshong and donated to the Chester Hospital.  After his death, he left in trust his art collection, mansion and 27-acre estate to the city of Chester as an art gallery and for educational purposes.  The value of the donation would be estimated at $24 million in current dollars. The bequest resulted in the establishment of the Deshong Memorial Park and the building of an art gallery.

Deshong Mansion

The Deshong mansion was built in 1850 on 22 acres off Edgemont Avenue in the Greek Revival Italianate style by Alfred's father, John O. Deshong, Sr. It was willed to the people of Chester after Alfred's death.  The land was turned into a public park named Deshong Park and an art museum was built on the property.  The mansion and art museum fell into disrepair in the 1980s. The trust was dissolved and the property was taken over by the Delaware County Industrial Development Authority.  The mansion suffered a partial collapse in 2013 and was demolished in 2014.

Deshong Art Museum and collection
The Deshong Art Museum was built in 1914 after his death on the same property as the Deshong Mansion.  The building was designed to be fireproof with exterior walls of Dover marble.  The large main gallery for paintings was modeled after the Emperor of Germany's gallery at Cassel.  It housed over 300 pieces of art including carved Japanese ivory figures, Chinese carved hard stone vessels and 19th century American and European paintings including American Impressionists Edward Redfield, Robert Spencer and George Loftus Noyes

Other select works from the collection include:
Allan Piu bella, painting by Francesco Vinea
Alpine Mountain Scene, painting by Alexandre Calame
At the Cobblers, painting by José Jiménez Aranda
Child Feeding her Pets (1872), painting by Gaetano Chierici
Departure for the Hunt (1899), painting by Vladimir Makovsky
 Hasty Pudding (1883), oil on canvas painting by Gaetano Chierici
Her Japanese Dolls (1872) by Adrien Moreau
Kindergarten, painting by Otto Piltz
Meadows in Winter, painting by George Loftus Noyes
Morning in Thuringia, painting by Barend Cornelis Koekkoek
 Raspberries on a Leaf (1858), oil on panel painting by Lilly Martin Spencer
Spirited Conflict (1859), painting by Alberto Pasini
The Artists Den, painting by Francois Auguste Biard
The Avalanche (1886), painting by Gerolamo Induno
Une gardienne du feu sacre de vesta by Louis Hector Leroux

Deshong's last art purchase was a pair of large Foo dogs cast in bronze.  The statues were placed flanking the doors of the Deshong mansion.

At one time it was the only public art gallery on the East Coast. From 1961 to 1978 the building was operated as a library, but over the years the museum fell into disrepair.

Art theft
In July 1977 the museum was looted and several pieces of art were stolen.  The heist was carried out by 15 year old Laurence McCall from Chester, Pennsylvania who would skip school and frequent the museum. The museum had limited security and McCall was able to steal paintings valued at the time at $450,000 by simply taking them off the wall and sliding them out of the museum's windows.  Many of the stolen items were sold through Sotheby's and other art auction houses in New York City.  McCall was eventually caught when he was 19.  The authorities were not able to prove that he stole the artwork, but he was convicted for failure to pay taxes, sentenced to fifteen years in prison and served three.  A majority of the artwork was recovered.

In 1979, Widener University leased the building and restored the museum.  In July 1984 the remaining trustees that managed the art museum dissolved the trust.  The Asian and impressionistic art collection and $500,000 of the trust were given to Widener University where the collection is currently displayed.

Personal life

Deshong was known as a lavish host, entertaining artists, musicians and political figures at the Deshong mansion.  He never married and became reclusive toward the end of his life.

Deshong is interred at Chester Rural Cemetery. His grave is marked by the bronze sculpture, "Sorrow" by Samuel Murray.

References

External links
The Widener University Art Collection & Gallery

1837 births
1913 deaths
19th-century American businesspeople
20th-century American philanthropists
American art collectors
American bankers
American mining businesspeople
Burials at Chester Rural Cemetery
People from Chester, Pennsylvania
People of Pennsylvania in the American Civil War
Philanthropists from Pennsylvania